Marino Dandolo (died before 1243) was a Venetian nobleman and first Latin ruler of the island of Andros following the Fourth Crusade. He was a member of the prominent Dandolo family. He accompanied Marco Sanudo on the conquest of the Aegean Islands in 1207, and was awarded the island of Andros as a sub-fief. He was expelled from his island around 1239 by Geremia Ghisi, and died in exile before August 1243.

References

Sources 

 
 

1240s deaths
Marino
Christians of the Fourth Crusade
Marino
Year of birth missing
13th-century Venetian people